Beardsley Dam (National ID # CA00263) is a dam on the Middle Fork Stanislaus River in Tuolumne County, California.  The site is surrounded by the Stanislaus National Forest.

Water and power
It impounds the Middle Fork of the Stanislaus River for hydroelectric power and irrigation water storage, part of the Stanislaus River Tri-Dam project cooperatively owned by the Oakdale Irrigation District and South San Joaquin Irrigation District.

Recreation includes camping, fishing, and boating.

See also 

Donnells Dam
Tulloch Dam
 List of dams and reservoirs in California

References 

Dams in California
Dams on the Stanislaus River
Buildings and structures in Tuolumne County, California
Hydroelectric power plants in California
Reservoirs in Tuolumne County, California
Stanislaus National Forest
United States local public utility dams
Dams completed in 1957
Energy infrastructure completed in 1957
Reservoirs in Northern California